Varangaon railway station is located near Varangaon town of Jalgaon district, Maharashtra. Its code is VNA. It has three platforms. Passenger, Express, and Superfast trains halt here.

Trains

The following trains halt at Varangaon railway station in both directions:

 Surat–Amravati Express
 Mumbai CSMT–Nagpur Sewagram Superfast Express
 Shalimar–Lokmanya Tilak Terminus Express
 Gondia–Kolhapur Maharashtra Express

References 

Railway stations in Jalgaon district
Bhusawal railway division